Unity University is a private university in Ethiopia. It is the first privately owned institute of higher learning to be awarded full-fledged university status in Ethiopia by the Ministry of Education. It is also the first private university in the country to offer postgraduate programs leading to master's degree in business administration (MBA) and development economics (MA).

History
Established in 1991, Unity language school was offering English, Arabic, French and Italian language courses. It started with less than 50 students, a few part-time teachers, and administration personnel.
Progressively, the institute launched
diploma programs in accounting,
marketing, business, personnel
administration, secretarial science and
office management from 1997 to
1999.
In March 1998 the institute was
upgraded to a college level, following its
achievements in education, becoming
the first privately owned college in
Ethiopia. Through
the years, the institute has played a
pioneering role in providing quality
education, setting a fine record. Later
named Unity College, the institute has
launched degree programs in various
disciplines.
Unity was promoted to university level
in September 2008, becoming the first
privately owned university. It has since
been known as Unity University,(U.U.).

Role
In addition to its educational role, the university encourages research and holds annual multi-disciplinary conferences. The proceedings of these conferences are published in its academic journal, The Ethiopian Journal of Business and Development.

Unity University is also very active in community service programs. It is involved in activities related to environmental protection and has participated in the "Clean and Green Addis Ababa" initiative.  Unity has also participated in other programs sponsored by the city council and chamber of commerce of Addis Ababa, such as HIV and AIDS awareness and prevention.

The university offers scholarships to students with financial difficulties, including a girls’ project, which extends assistance to deserving female students who lack financial resources. It also gives scholarships to its own staff who wish to upgrade their academic status, and to students with outstanding records in sports and other cultural activities.

Size
As of January 2012, the student population was 5,193, with 324 enrolled in the postgraduate program, 4,313 in undergraduate studies, and 556 in TVET programs including distance and continuing programs offered at its various centers. Unity has seventy-six academic staff of which five are women.

Requirements
Postgraduate
For MBA and MBA specializing marketing  - Holders of bachelor's degrees from recognized colleges and universities in such disciplines as management, marketing management, accounting, economics, engineering, medicine, public administration, political science among others.
For MA in development economics: Holders of bachelor's degrees in economics and related fields of specialization from recognized colleges and universities.
Undergraduate
As per the policies and regulations of the ministry of education (MOE) for admission to a tertiary level education institution in Ethiopia.
Completion of college preparatory school and with 360 and above points
GPA 3.00 and above in ESLCE for female applicants and GPA of 3.2 and above in ESLCE for male applicants.
Graduate from recognized universities and colleges can also apply for admission in advance standing or otherwise.
Levels
As per the policies and regulation of the MOE for admission to technical and vocational education and training (TVET) programs.

Duration
Postgraduate
Regular - three
Extension -four year
Undergraduate 
Regular - Four to six years

Facilities
Library
Computer labs with broadband Internet access
Printing house
Bookstore
TV and radio studio
Sport facilities
Cafeteria services
Clinic
Pharmacy

Notable alumni
Hayat Ahmed, model and beauty queen
Bethlehem Tilahun Alemu, businesswoman, class of 2004
Dawit Kebede, journalist and winner of the 2010 CPJ International Press Freedom Award
Amleset Muchie, actress and model (wife of Teddy Afro)

See also
 Education in Ethiopia
 List of universities and colleges in Ethiopia

References

Educational institutions established in 1998
1998 establishments in Ethiopia
Universities and colleges in Ethiopia
Education in Addis Ababa